Ángel Burgueño (born 12 June 1973 in Madrid) is a Spanish racing driver. He has competed in such series as World Series by Nissan and the Le Mans Series. He won the GTA class of the Spanish GT Championship in 2004 with Miguel Ángel de Castro.

24 Hours of Le Mans results

References

External links
 Official website (karting school)
 Career statistics from Driver Database

1973 births
Living people
Spanish racing drivers
Sportspeople from Madrid
Formula Renault Eurocup drivers
Euroformula Open Championship drivers
French Formula Three Championship drivers
British Formula Three Championship drivers
Auto GP drivers
24 Hours of Le Mans drivers
European Le Mans Series drivers
Epsilon Euskadi drivers